See also Chennai Rapid Bus Transit Ways, another planned bus transit system.

Chennai BRTS was a bus rapid transit system taken up as an integrated part of Circular Corridor Project in India. Beginning at Adyar, the route will cover Saidapet, Jafferkanpet, Ramavaram, Puzhal, Manali, Chennai Central Railway Station, Lighthouse and will return to Adyar. The route of the elevated BRTS corridor was planned to  run along the banks of Adyar river and Buckingham canal. The project was expected to be completed by 2013.

Corridors 
The BRTS system was supposed to be integrated with the Circular Corridor 1 of the High Speed Circular Corridors.
 Lighthouse — Adyar — IT corridor — Kundrathur — Madhuravoyal — Ennore — Vyasarpadi — Chennai Port — Lighthouse (Outer ellipse, Longest) [70.3 km]

Alignment
The Exclusive BRTS lane was proposed to be integrated with the circular corridor 1. Two different types were under consideration. 
 Along the median of the 6-lane single-tier system.
 On top of the 6-lane two-tier system. BRTS 2-lanes was proposed on the top tier and 4-lane for general traffic at the bottom second tier.

The following was the general alignment of the entire BRTS corridor. This was the  alignment of the entire BRTS corridor.

 Thiru-vi-ka Bridge — Ramavaram (elevated, along the median of circular corridor or top tiers)
 Ramavaram — NH-bypass (elevated, grade separated, beneath the circular corridor 1)
 NH-bypass — Madhavaram (elevated, along NH-bypass median)
 Madhavaram — TPP Road (elevated, along the median of IRR)
 TPP Road — Manali Oil Refinery(MOR) (elevated, along the median of Manali Oil Refinery Road (MORR)
 MOR — Chennai Central (elevated, along the western banks of North Buckingham Canal)
 Chennai Central — Adyar (elevated, along the Buckingham canal and abutting the MRTS)

Stations

Station Type
Tower structure was proposed for the BRTS stations. Two types depending on the type of the corridor [single or more tiers] were proposed.
 Towers along the median of the 6-lane single tier system.
 Towers along the curb-side for the 2-tier and 3-tier system.

Station Locations
21 bus stations were proposed for the first phase of the BRTS.

Design Speed
The speed design for the BRTS corridor was proposed to be 60 km/h - 70 km/h.

Integration of BRTS with other Transits
The BRTS was proposed to be integrated with different modes of transits already existing or under construction or proposed for the city. Apart from that major roads were also be to be integrated. The following is  a list of locations of BRTS integrating different modes of Transport in Chennai city.

Project Status

2008
November: 
 Wilbur Smith Associates won the contract of TNUIFSL to prepwere the feasibility study and DPR for the project.

2009
28 May: 
 DPR, cost estimates, work drawings and bid documents for the first leg of BRTS on Adyar corridor of the Chennai High Speed Circular Corridors (HSCC) was released to the public.
 Public consultation will be held soon.
3 June:
 Residents oppose the project as they will be displaced for the project.
 Adyar Poonga Trust promises to resettle the displaced.
26 August:
 Feasibility study for the project was likely to be over by January 2010. Total Corridor length was 110 km.

See also
 High Speed Circular Corridor
 Mass Rapid Transit System (Chennai)
 Chennai Metro
 Chennai Elevated Expressways
 Chennai Monorail
 Metropolitan Transport Corporation (Chennai)

References 

Urban transit in Chennai
Proposed bus rapid transit in India
Elevated bus rapid transit
Proposed infrastructure in Tamil Nadu